Harzandi or Harzani is a dialect of the Tati language, spoken in the northern regions of the East Azarbaijan province of Iran. It is strictly an oral language, and a descendant of the Old Azeri language that has long been extinct as a result of the diffusion of Turkish in the area.

General Information
Harzani Tati is considered an endangered language with a little less than 30,000 speakers in present day. Its speakers principally reside in the rural district of Harzand, particularly in the village known as Galin Qayah. Harzani is also present in the neighboring villages of Babratein and Dash Harzand.

As of now, Harzani has not been formally recognized by the Islamic Republic of Iran, and thus receives no government support.

Language Features
Like other languages and dialects of the Iranian language family, Harzani follows a subject–object–verb (SOV) word order. It has nine vowels, and shares a consonant inventory with Persian. It further exhibits a split-ergative case system: its present tense is structured to follow nominative-accusative patterning, while its past tense follows ergative-absolutive.

One characteristic that distinguishes Harzani from related Northwestern Iranian languages is its change from an intervocalic /d/ to an /r/. It also has a tendency to lengthen its vowels. For instance, it has the closed vowel /oe/.

Nouns and Pronouns
Nouns and pronouns in Harzani do not reflect grammatical gender, but they do express case. Nouns, in particular, encode two cases: direct and oblique case, the first of which is not rendered morphologically, but the second is by attaching a suffix. Meanwhile, personal pronouns have three cases: direct, oblique, and possessive.

Verbs
Verbs in Harzani are inflected for present tense and past tense. Information concerning person and number is reflected in suffixes that attach to these two verb stems. Modal and aspectual information is expressed using prefixes.

Numeral System
Part of Harzani's counting system is as follows:

Sample Words

See also
 Tati language

References

Further reading
 Kārang, A. A. 1954: Tāti va Harzani. Tabriz: Esma’il Va’ezpur.
 Korn, A. 2009: "Western Iranian Pronominal Clitics." In: Orientalia Suecana LVIII.
 Mortazavī, M. 1954: "Noktei cand az zabān-e harzani." In: NDATabriz 6, 304-314.
 Mortazavī, M. 1963: "Fe‘l dar zabān-e harzani." In: NDATabriz 15, 61-97.
 Stilo, D. 1981: "The Tati Language Group in the Sociolinguistic Context of Northwestern Iran and Transcaucasia." In: Iranian Studies 14.3/4, 137-187.
 Zokā, Y. 1957: "Gūyeš-e Galin-Qaye: 'Harzandi'." In: Farhang-e Irānzamin.

External links
  Harzani at the Endangered Languages Project
  Sample of Harzani on YouTube

Categories

Endangered Languages of Iran
Northwestern Iranian Languages
Languages of Iran